Novoaktashevo (Yañı Aqtaş) is a rural locality (a village) in Karlamansky Selsoviet, Karmaskalinsky District, Bashkortostan, Russia. The population was 45 as of 2010. There is 1 street.

Geography 
Novoaktashevo is located 9 km northeast of Karmaskaly (the district's administrative centre) by road. Ural is the nearest rural locality.

References 

Rural localities in Karmaskalinsky District